Annibelle was a comic strip created in 1929 by Dorothy Urfer. It was first published as a single panel cartoon on December 29, 1929, on the women's page of Newspaper Enterprise Association, Inc.'s Everyweek section. The humorous strip revolves around Annibelle's social life. In 1935, Annibelle began being printed in color. Virginia Krausmann took over the strip in March 1936. Annibelle comics were reprinted in The Funnies. Annibelle last ran on October 15, 1939.

Gallery

See also
Mopsy, a similar comic strip created by Gladys Parker

References

External links

Female characters in comics
1929 comics debuts
1939 comics endings
American comics characters
American comic strips
Comics about women
Comics characters introduced in 1929